Christopher Marsden  was an  Anglican priest: the Archdeacon of Man from 1700 until 1701.

Marsden was born in Prescot and educated at Brasenose College, Oxford. The Rector of Andreas, he died in a shipwreck on 3 October 1701.

Notes

People from Lancashire (before 1974)
Archdeacons of Man
1701 deaths
Alumni of Brasenose College, Oxford
People lost at sea